"Cheeky Song (Touch My Bum)" is a song by Popstars: The Rivals contestants the Cheeky Girls. Written by Pete Kirtley and Tim Hawes (under the name The Cheeky Boyz) and the girls' mother Margit Irimia, the song was released as a single on 2 December 2002, while the show was still running, and was later included on the group's debut album PartyTime. The song spent four non-consecutive weeks at number two in the UK Singles Chart in December 2002 and January 2003. It was also successful in several other European countries, reaching the top 10 in the Netherlands and the Flanders region of Belgium. Despite its success, the song was voted the worst pop record of all time in a Channel 4 poll, in January 2004.

Track listings

UK CD1
 "Cheeky Song (Touch My Bum)" (radio edit) – 3:21
 "Cheeky Song (Touch My Bum)" (Christmas mix) – 3:27
 "Cheeky Song (Touch My Bum)" (clubstar remix) – 6:09

UK CD2
 "Cheeky Song (Touch My Bum)" (radio edit) – 3:21
 "Cheeky Song (Touch My Bum)" (LMC remix) – 5:18
 "Cheeky Song (Touch My Bum)" (extended mix) – 6:05
 "Cheeky Song (Touch My Bum)" (video)

UK 12-inch vinyl
A1. "Cheeky Song (Touch My Bum)" (radio edit)
A2. "Cheeky Song (Touch My Bum)" (extended original mix)
B1. "Cheeky Song (Touch My Bum)" (LMC remix)
B2. "Cheeky Song (Touch My Bum)" (clubstar remix)

UK cassette single
 "Cheeky Song (Touch My Bum)" (radio edit)
 "Cheeky Song (Touch My Bum)" (LMC remix)

European CD single
 "Cheeky Song (Touch My Bum)" (radio edit) – 3:21
 "Cheeky Song (Touch My Bum)" (clubstar remix) – 6:09

Australian CD single
 "Cheeky Song (Touch My Bum)" (radio edit) – 3:23
 "Cheeky Song (Touch My Bum)" (Christmas mix) – 3:29
 "Cheeky Song (Touch My Bum)" (clubstar remix) – 6:06
 "Cheeky Song (Touch My Bum)" (LMC remix) – 5:21
 "Cheeky Song (Touch My Bum)" (video)

Charts and certifications

Weekly charts

Year-end charts

Certifications

Release history

See also
 2002 in British music charts
 List of music considered the worst

References

External links
 "The Cheeky Song (Touch My Bum)" video at YouTube

2002 debut singles
2002 songs
The Cheeky Girls songs
Number-one singles in Scotland
Songs written by Pete Kirtley
Songs written by Tim Hawes
Multiply Records singles